USS Sapphire (SP-710) was a United States Navy patrol vessel in commission from 1917 to 1918.

Sapphire was built as a small, private, wooden-hulled steam yacht of the same name in 1900 by the Herreshoff Manufacturing Company at Bristol, Rhode Island. On 8 June 1917, her owner, Jeremiah Milbank of New York City, enrolled her in the Naval Coast Defense Reserve and the US Navy ordered her into service for use as a section patrol boat during World War I. She was commissioned as USS Sapphire (SP-710) on 14 September 1917 at Brooklyn, New York.

After fitting out for naval service at Tebo's Yacht Basin, Sapphire joined the section patrol in the 3rd Naval District on 14 July 1918. She ceased active service on 20 November 1918, and was transferred from Section Base No. 7 to New York Harbor on 10 December 1918.

The patrol vessel  towed Sapphire to Robert Jacob's shipyard at City Island in the Bronx, New York, on 16 December 1918. She was decommissioned there and returned to Milbank that day.

References

SP-636: Lomado at Department of the Navy Naval History and Heritage Command Online Library of Selected Images: Civilian Ships: Sapphire (Steam Yacht, 1900). Served as USS Sapphire (SP-710) in 1917-1918
NavSource Online: Section Patrol Craft Photo Archive Sapphire (SP 710)

1900 ships
Individual yachts
Patrol vessels of the United States Navy
Ships built in Bristol, Rhode Island
World War I patrol vessels of the United States